Evolution is the tenth album by progressive rock band Nektar, released in 2004.  It was the first Nektar album since 1977's Magic Is a Child to feature original drummer Ron Howden, who rejoined other founding members Roye Albrighton and Taff Freeman.

Track listing

Personnel

Roye Albrighton – Guitars, Lead Vocals
Allan  "Taff " Freeman – Keyboards, Piano, Organ, Mellotron, Backing Vocals
Ron Howden – Drums, Backing Vocals
Randy Dembo – Bass Guitar, Bass Pedals, Backing Vocals

External links
Evolution at TheNektarProject.com

References 

2004 albums
Nektar albums